Lepa Brena (HITOVI – 6 CD-a) (English: Lepa Brena (HITS – 6 CDs)) is a box set by Yugoslav singer Lepa Brena. It was released by Grand Production on 29 February 2016. The six-disc box set was released in Europe, and included all of Pomračenje sunca (2000), Lepa Brena (The Best of – Dupli CD) (2003), Uđi slobodno... (2008), Začarani krug (2011) and Izvorne i novokomponovane narodne pesme (2013). The album artwork consisted of a collage of the album covers.
This is her third compilation album.

References

2016 albums
Lepa Brena albums
Grand Production albums